Anantnath Swami Temple  (also known as the Puliyarmala Jain Temple is a Jain temple located at Puliyarmala, 6 km from Kalpetta in the  Wayanad district in the state of Kerala in India. It is dedicated to Anantnath Swami, a Tirthankar of the Jain faith. The Jain temple is located at Puliyarmala, Kalpetta in the district of Wayanad in Kerala. It is dedicated to Lord Anantanatha, the 14th Tirthankara.

Gallery

See also
 Jainism in Kerala
 Jain Bunt

References

Citation

Sources

External links

Ananthanatha Swami Jain Temple
Jain Iconography

Jain temples in Kerala
Religious buildings and structures in Wayanad district
1st-century BC Jain temples